Komarichsky District is an administrative and municipal district (raion), one of the twenty-seven in Bryansk Oblast, Russia. It is located in the southeast of the oblast. Its administrative center is the urban locality (a work settlement) of Komarichi. Population:   20,065 (2002 Census);  The population of Komarichi accounts for 46.2% of the district's total population.

References

Notes

Sources

Districts of Bryansk Oblast